Tyler Francis Sabin (born October 15, 1994) is an American professional basketball player. He last played for Allianz Pazienza Cestistica San Severo of the Italian Serie A2.

College career
Sabin played college basketball for the Ripon Red Hawks of Ripon College. He left the school as its leader in career points (2,559), career scoring average (26.1 ppg), career 3-pointers made (283), single-season scoring average (30.7 ppg), single-season points (798) and was tied for fifth in school history for career 3-point percentage (.465) when he left. He was recognized with 2016-17 NABC All-America First Team and D3hoops.com men's All-America First Team honors.

Club career
Following his college career, Sabin had a pre-draft workout with the Milwaukee Bucks but ultimately went undrafted in the 2017 NBA draft. He later signed with the Hørsholm 79ers of the Danish Basketligaen where he went on to average 16.9 points in 25 games. The following season he played for Básquet Coruña in the Spanish LEB Oro. He saw action in 34 league games for Coruña, averaging 9.1 points per contest.

In June 2019, Sabin signed with Wetterbygden Stars of the Swedish Basketball League. During the 2019–20 season, he led the SBL in scoring (22.2 points per game) and helped the Stars to a 5th-place finish.

Sabin signed with KR of the Úrvalsdeild karla in September 2020. In his debut, he scored a season high 47 points in a 1-point loss against Tindastóll. During the regular season, he averaged 25.6 points, 3.8 rebounds and 4.0 assists per game. On 16 May 2021, he scored a game winning three pointer with 5 seconds left to beat Valur in the first game of its first round playoff series against KR. He reached the semifinals with KR, where they fell short to Keflavík. Sabin averaged 25.3 points a game in eight playoff appearances for KR. With 25.5 points per game over the course of the 2020-21 season, Sabin was the leading scorer of the Úrvalsdeild karla. 

In August 2021, Sabin signed with Cestistica Città di San Severo of Italy's Serie A2, Group B. He played for the team until the end of the 2021-22 season in which he was the leading scorer of the Serie A2 (21.6 points a contest).

References

External links
Icelandic statistics at Icelandic Basketball Association
Ripon College profile
profile at EuroBasket.com

1994 births
Living people
American expatriate basketball people in Denmark
American expatriate basketball people in Iceland
American expatriate basketball people in Spain
American expatriate basketball people in Sweden
American men's basketball players
Guards (basketball)
Hørsholm 79ers players
KR men's basketball players
Ripon Red Hawks men's basketball players
Úrvalsdeild karla (basketball) players